The Banking and Payments Federation Ireland (BPFI) is the main representative body for the banking and financial services sector in Ireland. The BPFI was formed in 2014 from the merger of the Irish Payment Services Organisation with the Irish Banking Federation (IBF). Its predecessor, the Irish Banking Federation, was founded in 1973 upon Ireland's accession to the European Communities. The IBF in turn succeeded the Irish Banks Standing Committee established upon independence in 1922. 

Former Fianna Fáil Senator and Party General Secretary Pat Farrell is the chief executive.

The group comprises domestic and international banks and financial services institutions operating in Ireland, and works with members, government, the Central Bank of Ireland and other groups to support the development and growth of the banking sector in Ireland. In 2009, the group ran seminars for the Irish financial services industry on data protection, customer relationship management and fraud prevention.

The Federation is a member of the European Banking Federation and the International Banking Federation.

References

External links

 Irish Banking Federation

Post-2008 Irish economic downturn
Banking in Ireland
Financial services in the Republic of Ireland
Finance industry associations
Financial services companies of the Republic of Ireland